Verzhiniya Ivanova Veselinova-Ignatova (born November 18, 1957 in Asenovgrad, Plovdiv) is a retired track and field shot putter from Bulgaria, best known for competing at the 1980 Summer Olympics in Moscow, USSR. There she ended up in fifth place, with a distance of 20.72 metres.

Achievements

References

 
sports-reference

1957 births
Living people
Bulgarian female shot putters
Athletes (track and field) at the 1980 Summer Olympics
Olympic athletes of Bulgaria
People from Asenovgrad